Emmanuel Kwesi Danso Arthur Junior (born 18 December 1994), known professionally as Kwesi Arthur, is a Ghanaian rapper, singer and songwriter from Tema, Ghana. He rose to fame in 2017 with the hit single "Grind day" which received wide spread acclaim and a co-sign from rap heavyweights Sarkodie and Medikal. In 2019, his second EP Live from Nkrumah Krom Vol II garnered more than 2 million streams in the first week of its release.

Arthur has won several accolades, including Rapper of the year and Hip Hop Song of the year at the Vodafone Ghana Music Awards as well as a Viewer's Choice Best International Act nomination at the 2018 BET Awards. He became the second Ghanaian rapper to be nominated for BET Hip Hop Awards Cypher after Sarkodie's nomination in 2019.

Early life and education
Kwesi Arthur was born on 18th December, 1994 in Tema. He was raised in Tema Community 9, and is the second of four children with a brother named Dayonthetrack, who is also a musician. After completing his high school education at Temasco in 2013, Kwesi's plans of furthering his education to study Psychology and Law at the University of Ghana came to a standstill due to a lack of funds. This led the rapper to consider a job offer as a security guard in Tema. Although he was accepted for the security job, Kwesi decided to pursue his music career at a local recording studio instead. Here, he made a deal with the owner of the recording studio to learn music production and record for free; in exchange, Arthur had to perform menial tasks around the studio like sweeping and general maintenance. In 2016, he met management from Ground Up Chale, a social media movement for young artists in West Africa, where he recorded his hit record Grind day at their studios a year later.

Music career
Kwesi Arthur started writing raps after listening to Drake's debut album, Thank Me Later.

In 2017, he released the lead single "Grind Day" from his debut EP, Live from Nkrumah Krom (2017). The record was released under his independent outfit and supported by a social movement called GroundUp Chale. He later released the remix for "Grind Day", featuring Sarkodie and Medikal.

Kwesi Arthur has collaborated with numerous Ghanaian musician, including Sarkodie, Medikal, KiDi, Jason E LA, R2Bees, B4bonah, M3dal, M.anifest, EL, Stonebwoy, Shatta Wale and South African rapper Nasty C . He was nominated for Best International Act at the 2018 BET Awards.

Kwesi Arthur is one of the most successful artists in Ghana, with his music being internationally recognised and awarded. In 2020 his song "Live From The 233" was one of the most streamed African songs on the streaming service Apple Music.

Discography

EPs
Live from Nkrumah Krom (2017)
This Is Not The Tape, Sorry 4 The Wait (2019)
Live from Nkrumah Krom Vol II Home Run (2019)
This Is Not The Tape, Sorry 4 The Wait II (2020)

Studio albums
Son Of Jacob (2022)

Singles

Awards and nominations

Ghana Music Awards

BET Awards

3 Music Awards

Videography

References

Living people
Ghanaian rappers
People from Tema
1994 births
21st-century Ghanaian male singers
21st-century Ghanaian singers
Musicians from Accra